Thomas J. "Tim" Lawry, Sr. (August 1, 1911 – September 19, 1999) was an American professional basketball player. He played college basketball for the University of Pittsburgh. Lawry then played in the National Basketball League for the Pittsburgh Pirates during the 1937–38 season and averaged 2.9 points per game. He also played semi-professional baseball for the Johnstown Johnnies and Zanesville Greys.

References

External links
 Thomas Lawry obituary

1911 births
1999 deaths
American men's basketball players
Baseball players from Pittsburgh
Baseball players from Cleveland
Basketball players from Pittsburgh
Basketball players from Cleveland
Forwards (basketball)
Johnstown Johnnies players
Pittsburgh Panthers men's basketball players
Pittsburgh Pirates (NBL) players
Zanesville Greys players